The 1931–32 Football League season was Birmingham Football Club's 36th in the Football League and their 19th in the First Division. They finished in ninth position in the 22-team division. They also competed in the 1931–32 FA Cup, entering at the third round proper and losing to Grimsby Town in the fourth.

Twenty-eight players made at least one appearance in nationally organised competition, and there were eleven different goalscorers. Half-back Lewis Stoker played in 41 of the 44 matches over the season, and, for the 11th successive year, Joe Bradford was leading scorer, with 28 goals, of which 26 came in the league.

Football League First Division

League table (part)

FA Cup

Appearances and goals

Players with name struck through and marked  left the club during the playing season.

See also
Birmingham City F.C. seasons

References
General
 
 
 Source for match dates and results: 
 Source for lineups, appearances, goalscorers and attendances: Matthews (2010), Complete Record, pp. 304–05.
 Source for kit: "Birmingham City". Historical Football Kits. Retrieved 22 May 2018.

Specific

Birmingham City F.C. seasons
Birmingham